Frederik Herman Henri (Frits) Kortlandt (born 19 June 1946) is a Dutch former professor of descriptive and comparative linguistics at Leiden University in the Netherlands. He writes on Baltic and Slavic languages, the Indo-European languages in general, and Proto-Indo-European, though he has also published studies of languages in other language families. He has also studied ways to associate language families into super-groups such as controversial Indo-Uralic.

Biography
Kortlandt was born on 19 June 1946 in Utrecht. Kortlandt, along with George van Driem and a few other colleagues, is one of the proponents of the Leiden School of linguistics, which describes language in terms of a meme or benign parasite.

Kortlandt holds five degrees from the University of Amsterdam:
 B.A., 1967, Slavic Linguistics and Literature
 B.A., 1967, mathematics and economics
 M.A., 1969, Slavic linguistics
 M.A., 1970, mathematical economics
 Ph.D., 1972, mathematical linguistics

He obtained his PhD under Carl Lodewijk Ebeling with a thesis titled: "Modelling the phoneme : new trends in East European phonemic theory". Kortlandt was a professor of Slavic Languages at Leiden University between 1975 and 2011.

Kortlandt has been a member of the Royal Netherlands Academy of Arts and Sciences since 1986 and is a 1997 Spinozapremie laureate. In 2007, he composed a version of Schleicher's fable, a story written in a hypothetical, reconstructed Proto-Indo-European, which differs radically from all previous versions.

References

External links
Frederik Kortlandt: Bibliography

1946 births
Living people
Writers from Utrecht (city)
Linguists from the Netherlands
Linguists of Indo-European languages
Balticists
Slavists
Paleolinguists
Linguists of Indo-Uralic languages
Members of the Royal Netherlands Academy of Arts and Sciences
University of Amsterdam alumni
Academic staff of Leiden University
Spinoza Prize winners